Mariano Barbacid Montalbán (born 4 October 1949 in Madrid) is a Spanish molecular biochemist who discovered the first oncogene HRAS.

Academic career 
He completed his higher education in the Universidad Complutense de Madrid, where he studied chemical sciences, and in the United States, where he started as an intern; years later he was appointed director of the National Cancer Institute. He then moved back to his native Spain to lead the newly created CNIO (Centro Nacional de Investigaciones Oncológicas). He also served on the Life Sciences jury for the Infosys Prize in 2011.

Scientific Research 
Barbacid is credited for isolating the human oncogene HRAS in bladder carcinoma. His discovery was published in Nature in 1982 in an article titled "A point mutation is responsible for the acquisition of transforming properties by the T24 human bladder-carcinoma oncogene". He spent the following months extending his research, eventually discovering that such oncogene was the mutation of an allele of the Ras subfamily, as well as its activation mechanism.

In 2003 he proved that the enzyme CDK2, until then believed to be indispensable in cellular division, was not necessary in order for DNA replication to take place.

Publications 

 «A point mutation is responsible for the acquisition of transforming properties by the T24 Human Bladder-Carcinoma Oncogene.» (1982).
 «Direct mutagenesis of HA-RAS-1 oncogenes by N-Nitroso-N-Methylurea during initiation of mammary carcinogenesis in rats.» (1985).
 "Ras genes." (1987).
 "The TRK proto-oncogene encodes a receptor for nerve growth-factor." (1991).
 "trkC, a new member of the trk family of tyrosine protein-kinases, is a receptor for neutotrophin-3." (1991).
 "Genetic analysis of mammalian cyclin-dependent kinases and their inhibitors." (2000).
 "Toll-like Receptor-4 (TLR4) Down-regulates MicroRNA-107, Increasing Macrophage Adhesion via Cyclin-dependent Kinase 6." (2011)

Awards 

His scientific career has been awarded with prizes such as the Distinguished Young Scientist Award (1983), the King Juan Carlos I Science award (1984), the Rhodes Memorial award (1985) and the Charles Rodolphe Brupbacher (2005). His effort has also been acknowledged with the Great Cross of the Order of 2 May (2011).

Other awards include:

 King Juan Carlos I Award (Spain, 1984)
 Rhodes Memorial Award (USA, 1985)
 Joseph Steiner Award (Switzerland, 1988)
 IPSEN Prize in neuronal plasticity (Austria, 1994)
 Charles Rodolphe Brupbacher Cancer Prize (Switzerland, 2005)
 International Agency for Research on Cancer Medal of Honor (France, 2007)

References 

1949 births
Living people
Spanish biologists
People from Madrid
Fellows of the AACR Academy
Foreign associates of the National Academy of Sciences